is a 1977 Japanese/American tokusatsu co-production, co-directed by Alexander Grasshoff and Tsununobu Kotani (the latter billed as Tom Kotani), and co-produced by Japan's Tsuburaya Productions and Rankin/Bass Productions. The picture was filmed at Tsuburaya Studios in Tokyo and on location in the Japanese Alps. The film was intended for a U.S. theatrical release, but failed to find a distributor and ended up as a television film, airing on ABC on February 11, 1977 in an edited 92-minute run time. The film was eventually picked up for overseas markets by Cinema International Corporation, where it was released in the unedited 106-minute version as a double feature in the U.K. with the edited version of Sorcerer (the latter considered a remake of The Wages of Fear). Toho also picked up distribution rights to The Last Dinosaur in Japan for a theatrical release utilizing the unedited 106-minute version in English with Japanese subtitles, and later the film debuted on Japanese television dubbed in Japanese.

The film stars Richard Boone and Joan Van Ark. William Overgard wrote the screenplay. The score was composed, as was most of the music for all Rankin/Bass specials and series, by Maury Laws, while the title song "He's the Last Dinosaur", with lyrics by Jules Bass, was sung by Nancy Wilson, and arranged and conducted by Bernard Hoffer.

Plot
Wealthy big-game hunter Maston Thrust has a multimillion-dollar company, Thrust Inc., which drills for oil under the polar caps with a manned laser drill called the "Polar Borer". Following one expedition, only one man, geologist Chuck Wade, returns; he explains that the drill was going through a routine check in the icecaps when it surfaced into a valley super-heated by a volcano. When the crew, except for Wade, began exploring the area, they were devoured by a Tyrannosaurus rex. Thrust decides to go there himself to study the creature. He brings with him Chuck; Bunta, a Maasai tracker; Dr. Kawamoto; and Frankie Banks, a Pulitzer Prize-winning photographer selected by the press pool. Thrust is initially unwilling to let Frankie join the crew, but she manages to convince him to allow her on the expedition by seducing him.

Upon arriving at the isolated valley using the Polar Borer, the group notices flying Pteranodons. Once they raft to shore, they avoid to be trampled by a Uintatherium. After setting up camp, Maston, Chuck, Bunta, and Frankie go out looking for the T. rex, while Kawamoto remains at the camp. The party encounters the T. rex and narrowly escapes from it. Later, the T. rex find the camp, destroying it and kills Kawamoto. It then attacks the Polar Borer and throws it into a canyon containing a bone field. While he continues his attack on the Polar Borer, a Triceratops unearths itself from the canyon and the two clash. After a fierce battle, the T. rex kills the Triceratops.

The group returns to the destroyed camp and notice Kawamoto is gone, as well as the Borer, which they mistakenly believe was sunk. Enraged, Thrust vows to kill the dinosaur. After a few months pass, the group is now living in a cave and has a number of encounters with cavemen in the area, but are able to turn them away with a handmade crossbow. They also befriend a cavewoman, who they name Hazel. While Hazel helps Frankie wash her hair, the T. rex returns. Frankie is able to flee to a cave, with the T. rex trying to get in. Thrust, Bunta, and Wade are able to turn it away with a large boulder tied to its tail. Thrust decides to kill the T. rex once and for all with a catapult.

After building the catapult, they wait for the dinosaur. Out hunting, Wade finds the Borer and realizes it is still operable. However, Thrust refuses to leave, wanting to kill the T. rex first. Wade and Frankie leave the camp to get the Borer fixed and then leave, while Thrust and Bunta remain. Once the Borer is launched back in the water, Frankie goes back to convince the others to leave with them one last time. While tracking the T. rex, Bunta is eaten by it. Frankie reunites with Thrust and helps him use the catapult on the T. rex, but it only injures it. The T. rex then goes on a rampage and destroys their catapult.

In the wake of the destruction, Wade arrives and states that they have to leave now or they will be trapped in the valley. Frankie pleads with Thrust to go with them and to leave the T. rex, as it is the "last one". However, Thrust replies "So am I...", and is therefore left behind with Hazel.

Cast
Richard Boone as Maston Thrust Jr.
Joan Van Ark as Francesca 'Frankie' Banks
Steven Keats as Chuck Wade
Luther Rackley as Bunta
Masumi Sekiya as Hazel (cavewoman)
William Ross as Hal (Mother 1 chief technician)
Carl Hansen as Barney
Tetsu Nakamura as Dr. Kawamoto
Nancy Magsig as Thrust's girl on plane
Don Maloney as Mother 1 captain
Vanessa Cristina as reporter
James Dale
Hyoe Enoki
Shunsuke Kariya as caveman leader
Gary Gundassen
Toru Kawai as the Tyrannosaurus
Tatsumi Nikamoto as the Triceratops (front end)

Production

Writing
The film was intended for a US theatrical release, but failed to find a distributor and ended up as a television film. Screenwriter William Overgard pitched to ABC a TV movie about a hunter who travels back in time to kill a dinosaur. ABC rejected the idea in favor if rock musical remake of King Kong. When that fell though, they came back to Overgard to develop his idea.

Filming
While the film featured mostly an English-speaking cast, a Japanese dub was created for the television release in Japan. The Japanese theatrical release, as well as the Japanese laserdisc release, used the English voice cast with Japanese subtitles.

Creature design
Unlike other bigger-budgeted movies that have used state-of-the-art effects (i.e., stop motion, puppets, etc.) for the dinosaurs, this movie uses the "man in a suit" method, much like the Godzilla movies of the 1960s and 1970s (the sound department even borrowed Godzilla's trademark roar and occasionally mixed it into the T. rexs roar). The "ceratopsian" (Uintatherium), as well as the Triceratops, were done through the "two guys in a horse-suit" technique.  The scale (size) of the Tyrannosaurus also changes literally from scene to scene, in some cases it appears to be over 40–50 feet tall (when it attacks the borer) and can carry it in its mouth, when the Polar Borer is easily well over 10 feet in diameter.  However, they do correctly state in the beginning of the movie that a Tyrannosaurus rex is 20 feet high and 40 feet long.

The Tyrannosaurus suit was created by Tsuburaya Production, portrayed by Toru Kawai, who played Godzilla in Zone Fighter and Terror of Mechagodzilla. The T-rex suit was later used for Ururu of the tokusatsu/anime combination TV series Dinosaur War Aizenborg.

The front end of the Triceratops suit was portrayed by Tatsumi Nikamoto, who acted opposite Kawai as Zone Fighter and Titanosaurus in the two works, respectively.

Home video

On May 22, 2009, Toho Video released the movie on DVD for the first time anywhere in the world. The DVD contains both English and Japanese audio tracks as well as an audio commentary in Japanese. This release uses an anamorphic 1.78:1 widescreen transfer of the unedited 106-minute theatrical release prepared by U.S. rights holder Warner Bros., and also contains a 13-minute interview with visual effects director Kazuo Sagawa, a photo gallery (which includes storyboards, production designs, and behind-the-scenes photos), a 15-minute behind-the-scenes production reel narrated by Sagawa, and the original Japanese theatrical release trailer.

On March 22, 2011, Warner Home Video released the movie on DVD in the U.S. through their Warner Archive Collection as a "made to order" DVD. This release uses the same widescreen transfer of the 106-minute unedited version as the Japanese Toho release, but lacks the supplemental materials.

Related
Journey to the Beginning of Time (1955)

References

External links
 

1977 films
1977 television films
1970s fantasy films
1970s science fiction films
1970s monster movies
1970s English-language films
English-language Japanese films
1970s Japanese-language films
Films about dinosaurs
Living dinosaurs in fiction
Films scored by Maury Laws
Films shot in Tokyo
Films directed by Alex Grasshoff
Giant monster films
Kaiju films
Science fiction television films
Toho tokusatsu films
Tsuburaya Productions
Rankin/Bass Productions films
Films directed by Tsugunobu Kotani
1977 multilingual films
1970s American films